The Kelti Group Headquarters is a 19-story,  office building designed by Taiwanese architect Kris Yao and completed in 2009 in Xinyi District, Taipei, Taiwan. The building houses the corporate headquarters of Kelti Group as well as the Taipei Branch of the Bank of China.

See also 
 List of tallest buildings in Taiwan
 List of tallest buildings in Taipei
 Xinyi Special District

References

2009 establishments in Taiwan
Buildings and structures in Taipei
Skyscraper office buildings in Taipei
Office buildings completed in 2009